Bad Men of Missouri is a 1941 American Western film directed by Ray Enright and written by Charles Grayson. The film stars Dennis Morgan, Jane Wyman, Wayne Morris and Arthur Kennedy. The film was released by Warner Bros. on July 26, 1941.

Plot
After the war, with Confederate money now useless, many Missouri farmers find themselves unable to pay their bills. William Merrick and his men begin foreclosing on them or running them off, resulting in the death of Martha Adams, sweetheart of one of the Younger gang.

The brothers Cole, Bob and Jim Younger ride back to Missouri just as their father is shot by Merrick's hired gun, Greg Bilson. A sheriff is killed as well and the Youngers are falsely accused of murdering him, so they retaliate by joining Jesse James's gang and pulling off robberies, giving the money to the needy farmers to pay their taxes.

Merrick decides to flush out Jim Younger by arresting the woman he loves, Mary Hathaway, as an accomplice to the Younger brothers' crimes. He offers to exchange Mary for Jim behind bars, secretly plotting to kill Jim once he's in his custody. The Youngers turn the tables, leading Merrick and Bilson to their own accidental deaths. They leave town and head for Minnesota to pull off another theft, but Mary and the Missourians try to figure a way to bring them safely back home.

Cast 
 Dennis Morgan as Cole Younger
 Jane Wyman as Mary Hathaway
 Wayne Morris as Bob Younger
 Arthur Kennedy as Jim Younger
 Victor Jory as William Merrick
 Alan Baxter as Jesse James
 Walter Catlett as Mr. Pettibone
 Howard Da Silva as Greg Bilson 
 Faye Emerson as Martha Adams
 Russell Simpson as Henry Washington Younger
 Virginia Brissac as Mrs. Hathaway
 Erville Alderson as Mr. Adams
 Hugh Sothern as Fred Robinson
 Sam McDaniel as Wash 
 Dorothy Vaughan as Mrs. Dalton
 William Gould as Sheriff Brennan
 Robert Winkler as Willie Younger 
 Ann E. Todd as Amy Younger
 Roscoe Ates as Lafe
 Jack Mower as Henchman (uncredited)

References

External links 
 

1941 films
1941 Western (genre) films
American Western (genre) films
American black-and-white films
1940s English-language films
Films directed by Ray Enright
Warner Bros. films
1940s American films